Mount Talbert is a volcanic cinder cone in Clackamas County, Oregon. It is part of the Boring Lava Field, a zone of ancient volcanic activity in the area around Portland.

The butte remains undeveloped and is the location of a nature park of the same name which is managed by North Clackamas Parks & Recreation District. The park has  of hiking trails, including Park Loop, Summit and West Ridge Trail, along which there are several instructive signs about the area's natural resources.

In 2005 the recreation district began promoting regrowth of more fire resistant white oak by girdling and removing Douglas firs, which impede the growth of the oaks by shading out the sun.

References

External links
 
 
 

Volcanoes of Oregon
Cinder cones of the United States
Extinct volcanoes
Mountains of Oregon
Volcanoes of Clackamas County, Oregon
Buttes of Oregon
Pleistocene volcanoes